Giuseppe Palazzotto (1702 – 1764) was an Italian architect, active in Catania, Sicily in a Baroque style. He was employed extensively during the flurry of reconstruction after the 1693 Sicily earthquake which nearly flattened his native city. He helped design the church and monastery of San Giuliano, Santa Chiara, Sant'Agostino, Palazzo Zappala, Palazzo del Senato,  and the Palazzo Biscari.

References

1706 births
1764 deaths
People from Catania
18th-century Italian architects